Brescia railway station  is the main station of Brescia, in the region of Lombardy, northern Italy. The station, opened in 1854, lies on the Milan-Venice railway and is a terminus of three branch lines: Valcamonica Railway to Edolo, Bergamo–Brescia railway and Brescia–Piadena/Cremona railway which branches off towards southeast of the station.

Connection to the Milan-Venice high-speed railway (Milan-Verona section) entered operation on 11 December 2016. Construction of the section between Brescia and Verona is still underway. Upon completing the entire section, however, some trains might bypass Brescia to run non-stop between Milan and Verona.

The station is currently managed by Rete Ferroviaria Italiana (RFI). The commercial area of the passenger building, however, is managed by Centostazioni. These companies are full subsidiaries of Ferrovie dello Stato (FS), Italy's state-owned rail company. Train services are operated by Trenitalia, Trenord and NTV-Italo.

Location
Brescia railway station is situated at Viale della Stazione, the south-western edge of the city centre.

History
Designed by the engineer Benedetto Foix, Brescia station was opened on 24 April 1854 upon the inauguration of the Milan–Venice Railway. The passenger building is constructed in a neoclassical style and influenced by neo-Roman elements and medieval style fortifications.

Train lines
The station has eleven tracks, three of those are bay platforms located at the western end. The bay platforms are exclusively used for trains operating on the Valcamonica Railway (Brescia–Iseo–Edolo railway). Additional tracks are dedicated to goods trains to and from Brescia Scalo or used for storage of rolling stock.

The station is used by 60,000 passengers per day and about 20 million passengers per year.

The following services call at this station:

Domestic (High-speed)
 High-speed train (Trenitalia Frecciarossa) Milan-Venice: Milan - Brescia - Peschiera del Garda - Verona - Vicenza - Padua - Venice
 High-speed train (Trenitalia Frecciarossa) Turin-Venice: Turin - Milan - Brescia - Peschiera del Garda - Verona - Vicenza - Padua - Venice
 High-speed train (Trenitalia Frecciabianca) Turin-Venice: Turin - Milan - Brescia - Peschiera del Garda - Verona - Vicenza - Padua - Venice
 High-speed train (Trenitalia Frecciargento) Brescia-Rome: Brescia - Verona - Bologna - Florence - Rome
 High-speed train (Trenitalia Frecciargento) Bergamo-Rome: Bergamo - Brescia - Verona - Bologna - Florence - Rome
 High-speed train (Italo NTV) Brescia-Naples: Brescia - Verona - Bologna - Florence - Rome - Naples

Domestic
 Regional train (Trenord Regional Express) Milan-Verona: Milan - Treviglio - Brescia - Desanzano del Garda - Peschiera del Garda - Verona
 Regional train (Trenord Regional) Brescia-Parma: Brescia - Ghedi - Asola - Piadena - Casalmaggiore - Parma
 Regional train (Trenord Regional) Brescia-Bergamo: Brescia - Rovato - Bergamo
 Regional train (Trenord Regional) Brescia-Edolo: Brescia - Iseo - Pisogne - Darfo Corno - Boario Terme - Breno - Capo di Ponte - Edolo
 Regional train (Trenord Regional) Brescia-Iseo: Brescia - Brescia Ospitaletto - Rovato - Iseo
 Regional train (Trenitalia Regional) Brescia-Cremona: Brescia - Manerbio - Verolanuova - Cremona
 Regional train (Trenitalia Regional) Bergamo-Pisa: Bergamo - Rovato - Brescia - Cremona - Fidenza - Pontremoli - Massa Centro - Pisa

Cross-border

(CH for Switzerland, A for Austria, D for Germany)

 Night train (ÖBB Nightjet) Milan-Munich: Milan - Brescia - Peschiera del Garda - Verona - Vicenza - Padua - Villach (A) - Salzburg (A) - Rosenheim (D) - Munich (D)
 Night train (ÖBB Nightjet) Milan-Vienna: Milan - Brescia - Peschiera del Garda - Verona - Vicenza - Padua - Villach (A) - Klagenfurt (A) - Leoben (A) - Vienna/Wien (A)
 Intercity train (SBB-CFF-FFS EuroCity) Geneva-Milan/Venice: Geneva (CH) - Brig (CH) - Milan (Centrale) - (Brescia) - (Verona) - (Padua) - (Venice)
From June 2017, a new intercity service between Venice and Zürich (CH) will be launched by Trenitalia and SBB-CFF-FFS.

Interchange
Brescia railway station is connected to Stazione FS of the Brescia Metro.

Two bus stations are located outside the station's passenger building. The main bus terminal, directly linked by a short walkway, has interurban services to Mantova, Verona and airport shuttles to Milan-Bergamo (Orio al Serio) Airport. The smaller, road-side SIA bus station has interurban bus services to Bergamo and various towns and villages of Valcamonica.

See also

History of rail transport in Italy
List of railway stations in Lombardy
Rail transport in Italy
Railway stations in Italy

References

External links

Description and pictures of Brescia railway station 

This article is based upon a translation of the Italian language version as at January 2011.

Railway Station
Railway stations in Lombardy
Railway stations opened in 1854
1854 establishments in the Austrian Empire